Moharam Fouad also known as Muharram Fouad (24 June 1934 – 27 June 2002) was a famous Egyptian singer and movie star.

Fouad was born on 24 June 1934 in Cairo, Egypt.

Fouad's introduction to the screen came in 1959 with the film Hassan and Nayima, a legendary Egyptian love story with Soad Hosny.

"Moharam had a unique character, a special flavor and fought his way in the singing career without copying other celebrities singers of his time," said Tarek Shinawy, a renowned movie critic.

Throughout his lifetime he sang well over 900 songs, 20 of which in praise of Palestine. One of his songs - called Rimsh Enoh (His Eye Lashes) - got him fans from around the world.

He had some heart complications and he had to go to Europe to be treated, however complications with his kidneys caused continuous problems. He died on 27 June 2002 leaving the scene empty for the people who loved him.

Personal life
Fouda had four brothers and four sisters. He started singing from the age of four when he was chosen from his school to sing solo in front of King Farouk. He had several marriages but had only one son, Tarek. His grandson is the Belgian-Egyptian singer Tamino.

Filmography
Hassan and Nayima - Hassan and Naeima
Min Gheer Meaad - Without Arrangement
Hekayet Gharam - Love Story
Shabab Tayesh - A Reckless Youth
Ushaq al-Haya - Lovers of Life
Salasel Min Harir - Chains of Silk
Wolidtou Min Gadid - Born Anew
Lahn al-Sada - Tune of Happiness
Al Siba wal Jamal – The Youth & Beauty
Nisf Azraa - Half Virgin
Ettab - Admonition
Wadaan Ya Hob - Farewell to Love
El Malika wa Ana - The Queen & I

References

External links

elcinima.com

1934 births
2002 deaths
People from Cairo
Burials in Egypt
EMI Classics and Virgin Classics artists
Egyptian male film actors
Singers who perform in Egyptian Arabic
20th-century Egyptian male singers
20th-century Egyptian male actors